Perceval le Gallois is a 1978 historical drama film written and directed by Éric Rohmer, based on the 12th-century Arthurian romance Perceval, the Story of the Grail by Chrétien de Troyes.

Synopsis
The film chronicles Percival's knighthood, maturation and eventual peerage amongst the Knights of the Round Table, and also contains brief episodes from the story of Gawain and the crucifixion of Christ.

Cast
 Fabrice Luchini as Perceval
 André Dussolier as Gauvain
 Arielle Dombasle as Blanchefleur
 Marie Rivière as Garin's daughter
 Pascale de Boysson as widow lady

Presentation
Unlike other screen adaptations of Arthurian legend, the film makes no attempt at situating the characters in a natural or supernatural world. Instead, Perceval and his cohorts inhabit a colorful theatrical realm replete with rudimentary props, stylized backdrops, and a singing chorus that participates in the drama. At many points, characters narrate their own actions and thoughts rather than expressing them manifestly, and dialog is frequently spoken lyrically in rhyming couplets taken directly from the original text. The film's deliberate artificiality, ironic vision of youthful valor, and frequently shifting narrative modes prevent emotional attachment to the story while leaving space for a more cerebral engagement with the elements of storytelling Rohmer has interpreted from 12th-century literature.

References

External links
 
 
 

1978 films
1970s French-language films
1970s historical drama films
Arthurian films
Films based on French novels
Films based on poems
Films based on works by Chrétien de Troyes
Films directed by Éric Rohmer
Films produced by Barbet Schroeder
Films produced by Margaret Ménégoz
Films shot in Île-de-France
French historical drama films
German historical drama films
Italian historical drama films
West German films
Works based on Perceval, the Story of the Grail
1970s French films
1970s Italian films
1970s German films